WHAZ-FM (97.5 FM) is a radio station broadcasting a religious format. Licensed to Hoosick Falls, New York, United States, the station serves the easternmost portion of the Capital District, Bennington, Vermont, and North Adams, Massachusetts as a satellite of WHAZ.  The station is owned by Capital Media Corporation.

History
The station signed on July 4, 1991, as WNGN, a gospel station owned by Northeast Gospel Broadcasting.  The station was sold to Aritaur Communications in 1998, who renamed the station WZEC with the intention of implementing a simulcast of Pittsfield top 40 station WBEC-FM (then at 105.5, now WWEI; now on 95.9).  WNGN's programming was then merged into WNGX (91.9), which took the WNGN call letters.  However, WNGN continued to run WZEC well into 1999, as the sale did not close until June 30; the next day, Aritaur sold WZEC, along with WBEC and WBEC-FM, to Tele-Media Broadcasting, who finally implemented the WBEC-FM simulcast by that September.  By the following May, the station had again changed format, this time to a modern adult contemporary format, "The Point", modeled on sister stations WCPT (100.9; now WKLI-FM) and WKBE (then at 100.3, now WFFG-FM; now on 107.1).  The station was sold to Vox Media in 2002, and shifted to soft adult contemporary in 2004.

Vox sold WZEC to Capitol Media in 2005, who changed the call letters to the current WHAZ-FM and implemented a classic gospel format on November 7, before switching to the simulcast of WHAZ by April 2007.

Translators
WHAZ-FM's programming was previously rebroadcast by four translators. The licenses for all four translators were cancelled by the Federal Communications Commission (FCC) on August 8, 2017, due to the licensee failing to comply with the terms of an FCC consent decree.

See also
 WHAZ (AM)

References

External links

Radio stations established in 1991
HAZ-FM
1991 establishments in New York (state)